Amy's may refer to:

Companies
 Amy's Candy Bar
 Amy's Ice Creams
 Amy's Kitchen

Laws
 Amy's Law (Georgia)
 Amy's Law (Ohio)

Media
 "Amy's Back in Austin", a 1994 song by Little Texas
 Amy's Baking Company, an episode of Kitchen Nightmares
 Amy's Choice (Doctor Who)
 Amy's Eyes, a 1985 novel
 "Amy's Eyes" (song), a 1989 song
 Amy's Orgasm, a 2001 film
 "Amy's Song", a 2011 single by Brent Anderson
 Amy's View, a 1997 play

Sports
 Amy's Kitchen-Perpetual (also known as Amy's Spikers)
 Amy's Ride

See also
 Amy's Choice (disambiguation)